The Barsoi–New Farakka section is an Indian railway line connecting Barsoi with New Farakka junction on the Howrah–New Jalpaiguri line. This  track is under the jurisdiction of Eastern Railway and Northeast Frontier Railway.

History 
With the partition of India in 1947, a major portion of the Calcutta–Siliguri line ran through East Pakistan, now Bangladesh. With several rail links in Bihar, the attention was on those links, and new links were developed. However, one hurdle stood out. There was no bridge across the Ganga river even in Bihar. A generally acceptable route to Siliguri was via Sahibganj loop to Sakrigali ghat. Across the Ganges by ferry to Manihari Ghat. Then metre gauge via Katihar and Barsoi to Kishanganj and finally narrow gauge to Sliguri. In 1949 Kishanganj-Siliguri section was converted to metre gauge.

In the early 1960s, when Farakka Barrage was being constructed, a far reaching change was made. Indian Railways constructed a new broad-gauge rail link from south Bengal. New Jalpaiguri, a new broad-gauge station was built south of Siliguri Town. This Kumedpur-Barsoi section was built in 1959. The entire section from Barsoi to Khejuriaghat was completed and connected by 1962. Steamer services connected the north and south banks of the river thereby linking North & South Bengal

Branch lines 
The Old Malda–Abdulpur section is used up to Singhabad on the Indian side. Bangladesh started export of fertilizer to Nepal utilizing the Rohanpur–Singhabad transit point in November 2011.

References 

5 ft 6 in gauge railways in India
Railway lines in Bihar